is a condiment in Japanese cuisine, commonly used as relish for Japanese curry.  In fukujinzuke, vegetables including daikon, eggplant, lotus root and cucumber are finely chopped, then pickled in a base that is flavored with soy sauce. The end result has a crunchy texture.

Relation to Japanese folklore 

The name originates from the tale of Seven Lucky Gods.  In homage to the name, some varieties of fukujinzuke consists of seven different kind of vegetables, adding sword beans, perilla, shiitake mushrooms and/or sesame seeds to the four main ingredients. Lotus root is sometimes replaced with the similarly sweet and crunchy carrot, and the red varieties often add sliced beetroot for color.

See also

References

External links 
 Fukujinzuke at The Japanese Kitchen Cookbook

Japanese pickles